This list of manually curated human transcription factors is taken from Lambert, Jolma, Campitelli et al.
It was assembled by manual curation.
More detailed information is found in the manuscript and the web site accompanying the paper (Human Transcription Factors)

List of human transcription factors (1639)

References 

Transcription factors
Biology-related lists